Empress of Scotland may refer to one of these Canadian Pacific Steamships ocean liners:

 , 24,581-gross ton ship capable of 18 knots; scrapped in 1930
 , 30,030-gross ton ship capable of 22 knots; scrapped 1966

Ships of CP Ships
Ship names